Wilde (also: Wölfte) is a river of Hesse, Germany. It passes through Bad Wildungen, and flows into the Eder in Wega.

See also
List of rivers of Hesse

References

Rivers of Hesse
Rivers of Germany